The Rătășel is a left tributary of the Crișul Negru in Romania. It flows into the Crișul Negru near Tăut.

References

Rivers of Romania
Rivers of Bihor County